Luca La Rosa (born 20 September 1988) is an Italian professional footballer who plays as a midfielder for  club Olbia.

Club career
Born in Olbia, La Rosa started his career for local club Olbia Calcio on Serie C2. He made his debut on 28 January 2007 against Varese. He played another match the next season, and left the club and joined to Serie D club Calangianus, and the next season he played with Arzachena.

La Rosa returned to Olbia in the 2010–2011 season, this time in Eccellenza. He played for three years for the club.

After played two season with modest US San Teodoro, in 2015 he signed with Arzachena on Serie D. He played four years for the club, winning the promotion to Serie C in 2016–17 Serie D. La Rosa made his Serie C debut on 27 August 2017 against Arezzo.

On 27 May 2019, he returned again to Olbia, on Serie C. On 6 June 2021, he extended his contract with the club.

References

External links
 
 

1988 births
Living people
People from Olbia
Footballers from Sardinia
Italian footballers
Association football midfielders
Serie C players
Lega Pro Seconda Divisione players
Serie D players
Eccellenza players
Olbia Calcio 1905 players
Arzachena Academy Costa Smeralda players